Melissa Manchester (born February 15, 1951) is an American singer, songwriter and actress. Since the 1970s, her songs have been carried by adult contemporary radio stations. She has also appeared on television, in films, and on stage.

Early life and career 

Manchester was born in the Bronx, a borough of New York City, into a musical family. Her father, David Manchester, was a bassoonist for the New York Metropolitan Opera for three decades. Her mother was one of the first women to design and found her own clothing firm, Ruth Manchester Ltd. The Manchesters are of Jewish origin. 

Manchester started a singing career at an early age. She learned the piano and harpsichord at the Manhattan School of Music, began singing commercial jingles at age 15, and became a staff writer at age 17 for Chappell Music while attending Manhattan's High School of Performing Arts.

She studied songwriting at New York University with Paul Simon when she was 19. Manchester played the Manhattan club scene, where Barry Manilow, a friend and fellow singer of jingles, introduced her to Bette Midler. In 1971, she became a member of the Harlettes, the back-up singers for Midler, which she co-created with Manilow.

Manchester made a brief speaking appearance as "Yoko Ono" on the 1972 album National Lampoon Radio Dinner, on the track titled "Magical Misery Tour," and as the singer in "Deteriorata".

Solo career 
Manchester's debut album, Home to Myself, was released in 1973; Manchester co-wrote many of its songs with Carole Bayer Sager. Two years later, her album Melissa produced her first top-ten hit, "Midnight Blue", which enjoyed 17 weeks on the Billboard Hot 100 charts. The song's peak position was #6 for the week of August 9, 1975.

In 1974, she performed the songs "O Heaven" and "Home to Myself" on the pilot episode of Ms. magazine's television show, Woman Alive!, a feminist program. She performed the song live on Burt Sugarman's television series Midnight Special in 1974.

In 1976, Manchester released 'Come in From the Rain' on her 1976 Better Days & Happy Endings album. It has since been covered by several other artists including The Captain & Tennille, Rosemary Clooney, Vic Damone, Eydie Gorme, Shirley Horn, Cleo Laine, Peggy Lee, Carmen McRae, Jane Olivor,Liza Minnelli, Barbara Cook, Mel Torme, and Diana Ross.

Manchester appeared with Richie Havens, Melanie, and Frankie Valli as a contributor and performer in the 1977 NBC special documentary How the Beatles Changed the World. Manchester collaborated with Kenny Loggins to co-write Loggins' 1978 hit duet with Stevie Nicks, "Whenever I Call You 'Friend. She would later record this for her 1979 Melissa Manchester album. She guest-starred on the CBS-TV daytime soap opera Search for Tomorrow to teach a main character (played by Michael Nouri), who played a singer-songwriter, the essentials of the craft. In 1979, Manchester reached #10 with her version of Peter Allen's "Don't Cry Out Loud", for which she received a Grammy nomination for Best Pop Female Vocal Performance.

In 1979, she performed two nominated songs on the Academy Awards show: "I'll Never Say Goodbye" (from The Promise) and "Through the Eyes of Love" (theme song from Ice Castles). The winning song that year was "It Goes Like It Goes", from Norma Rae.

In 1980, she appeared on The Muppet Show.

In 1982, she released the smash "You Should Hear How She Talks About You", which won the 1983 Grammy for Best Pop Female Vocal Performance, beating out Linda Ronstadt, Olivia Newton-John, Juice Newton, and Laura Branigan. The song itself reached #4 in Cash Box and #5 on the Billboard Hot 100 chart as well as #10 Adult Contemporary.

In 1985, she signed with MCA Records and released the album Ma+hematics.

Manchester continued to place singles on the Adult Contemporary charts throughout the 1980s. Another top-ten entry on the AC chart was a 1989 updating of Dionne Warwick's "Walk on By". The single was pulled from her Mika/Polygram album Tribute, which honored some of the singers that influenced her style.  In 1992 she sang the title song for the animated musical Little Nemo: Adventures in Slumberland, written by the Sherman Brothers and accompanied by the London Symphony Orchestra.

In 1995, she released the album If My Heart Had Wings on Atlantic Records.

She appeared as herself during a two-day guest appearance on the ABC-TV daytime drama General Hospital to sing the song for Robin Scorpio and her AIDS-afflicted boyfriend Stone Cates.

Throughout the 1980s and 1990s Manchester alternated recording with acting, appearing with Bette Midler in the film For the Boys, on the television series Blossom, and co-writing (with bookwriter-lyricist Jeffrey Sweet) and starring in the musical I Sent a Letter to My Love based on the Bernice Rubens novel of the same name. In 1990, Manchester could be heard performing "I Wish I Knew", played over the opening credits of the CBS television drama The Trials of Rosie O'Neill. In addition, she opened Game 6 of the 1991 World Series singing the U.S. National Anthem.

Later career to present 
Manchester composed and recorded the soundtrack to the direct-to-video Lady and the Tramp II: Scamp's Adventure (2001).

In 2004, Manchester returned with her first album in nine years, When I Look Down That Road. While touring to support the album, she was praised for her still "powerful voice" and for "reinventing [herself] while staying true to what made [her] popular."

In April 2007, she returned to theater, starring in the Chicago production of HATS! The Musical, a show to which she and Sharon Vaughn contributed two songs. Also in 2007, she recorded a duet cover with Barry Manilow of the Carole King classic "You've Got a Friend" on Manilow's The Greatest Songs of the Seventies. In 2008, Manchester released a new single, "The Power of Ribbons", to digital retailers. Proceeds from othe single benefit breast cancer research.

In 2011 an independent film named Dirty Girl was released with many of Manchester's songs used throughout the film, five of which made it onto the soundtrack. Manchester made a non-speaking cameo appearance as the pianist who accompanies the lead character's rendition of  "Don't Cry Out Loud".

In 2013, Manchester announced that she was recording her 20th studio album, You Gotta Love the Life, her first since When I Look Down That Road.  She subsequently launched an Indiegogo campaign to raise funds to independently release the album.

In an interview with NPR, Manchester talks about the crowd-funding experience and relays the back-story behind the single "Feelin' for You". A drunk in a juke joint approached Manchester and asked if she was married, to which she replied, "Yes, very happily." The drunk replied, "Too bad, cause I got a feelin' for you." "Feelin' for You", written by Manchester and Sara Niemietz, includes a solo by Keb' Mo'. The single was released on January 9, 2015, and premiered at #2 on the Smooth jazz charts. You Gotta Love the Life was released on February 10, 2015, and hit #17 on the Billboard Jazz Albums chart for the week of February 28, 2015.

A second single, "Big Light", featuring a duet with Al Jarreau, along with an accompanying music video, was released for radio on June 15, 2015.

In 2017, more than 25 years after Melissa released ‘’Tribute’’, her 1989 album honoring the female singers who influenced her, she released ’’The Fellas’’, with covers of male influences including Tony Bennett, Dean Martin, Johnny Mathis, Frank Sinatra and Mel Torme. This was Manchester's second independently produced  studio album, which featured accompaniment by the Blue Note Orchestra from Citrus College in Glendora, CA, where she is artist-in-residence. There was only one duet on the album, 'For Me and My Gal', performed with Barry Manilow.

During the pandemic of 2020, Melissa kept busy working on her 24th album, RE:VIEW, a re-envisioned and reworked compilation of several of her previous hits. She released just one song per month with its accompanying video, which addressed the political and social climates of the time. The complete album was planned for a Fall 2021 release via CD and streaming services.

In 2021, she returned to playing club dates, though mainly telling stories and singing just a few songs of her catalog. During one such performance in which she shared the stage with Michael Feinstein, Melissa was surprised by Feinstein and Songbook Foundation Executive Director Christopher Lewis with the Songbook Hall of Fame's New Standard Award. While presenting her with the award, Feinstein said, "Among the awards we present each year is the New Standard Award, which is presented to a songwriter or performer who continues to write and perform music that will stand the test of time and become the pop standards of tomorrow. I can't think of anyone who fits that description more than Melissa Manchester. Her music has touched the lives of so many people over the years. Her songs – many of which we heard tonight – have become standards and are part of the fabric of our lives."

Awards and recognitions 
 In 1980, "Through The Eyes of Love" (from the Ice Castles original soundtrack) and "I'll Never Say Goodbye" (from The Promise) were nominated for Academy Awards (Manchester did not write the songs, and as such, was not an Academy Award nominee).
Grammy Award: "You Should Hear How She Talks About You" (1982) (Best Female Pop Vocal Performance).
Bronx Walk of Fame
Manchester received the Governor's Award from the National Academy of Recording Arts & Sciences for her contributions to the music & recording arts.
Her body of work to date as a singer/songwriter was a featured exhibit at the Lyman Allyn Art Museum.
Manchester is an adjunct professor at the USC Thornton School of Music.
Manchester presented "The Sonic Thermal" at TEDxRiverside explaining her lifelong focus on both random and composed melodies and the back-story behind her first crowd-funded album.
Melissa was surprised by Feinstein and Songbook Foundation Executive Director Christopher Lewis with the Songbook Hall of Fame's New Standard Award for her contributions to The American Songbook and her timeless music on May 15, 2021.

Discography

Studio albums 
1973: Home to Myself – US #156
1974: Bright Eyes – US #159
1975: Melissa – US #12
1976: Better Days and Happy Endings – US #24
1976: Help Is on the Way – US #60
1977: Singin'... – US #60
1978: Don't Cry Out Loud – US #33, AUS #75
1979: Melissa Manchester – US #63, AUS #93
1980: For the Working Girl – US #68
1982: Hey Ricky – US #19, AUS #33
1983: Emergency – US #135
1985: Mathematics – US #144
1989: Tribute
1995: If My Heart Had Wings
1997: Joy
1998: The Colors of Christmas
1998: I Sent a Letter to My Love, a musical recorded by L.A. Theatre Works
2004: When I Look Down That Road
2015: You Gotta Love the Life
2017: The Fellas
2030: M Re:View-Just You And I
Live albums

 2022: Live '77

Compilation albums 
1983: Greatest Hits – US #43, AUS #98
1984: The Many Moods of Melissa Manchester
1996: Best Selection (Japan release)
1997: The Essence of Melissa Manchester
2001: Midnight Blue: Encore Collection
2004: Platinum & Gold Collection
2013: Playlist: The Very Best of Melissa Manchester
2017: Through The Eyes Of Love: The Complete Arista 7" Singles – 2CD set

Songs featured on soundtrack albums and various artist compilations 
1979: "I'll Never Say Goodbye", from the motion picture soundtrack for The Promise
1979: "Through the Eyes of Love", from the motion picture soundtrack for Ice Castles – US #179
1984: "Your Place or Mine", from the motion picture soundtrack for A Little Sex
1984: "Thief of Hearts", from Thief of Hearts soundtrack – US #179
1986: "The Music of Goodbye" (duet with Al Jarreau), from Out of Africa soundtrack
1986: "Sittin' on a Dream" from The Money Pit soundtrack
1986: "Let Me Be Good to You", from Disney's The Great Mouse Detective
1989: "Little Nemo", from Little Nemo: Adventures in Slumberland (U.S. release 1992)
1989: "Slumberland", from Little Nemo: Adventures in Slumberland (U.S. release 1992)
1996: "Stand in the Light", duet with Tats Yamashita on Tatsuro Yamashita-Cozy – Japan #15
2003: "Treasure", from Once in a Lifetime-Mayo Okamoto
2007: "I Know Who I Am", sung by Leona Lewis on For Colored Girls & The Butler
2011: "Rainbird", original song from Dirty Girl

Singles

Guest appearances

Filmography 
Manchester appeared on the Blossom television series as Maddy Russo, from 1993 to 1995. She played Corrine in the feature film For the Boys (1991) and the piano teacher in Dirty Girl (2010). In addition to live performances as herself, Manchester composes and performs songs and has done character voice in animated works.

References

External links 

1951 births
Arista Records artists
Audiobook narrators
Bell Records artists
MNRK Music Group artists
Grammy Award winners
Jewish American actresses
Jewish American musicians
Jewish American songwriters
Jewish women singers
Living people
People from the Bronx
Actresses from New York City
Singers from New York City
Songwriters from New York (state)
American contraltos
American film actresses
American television actresses
American voice actresses
Fiorello H. LaGuardia High School alumni
Tisch School of the Arts alumni
Manhattan School of Music alumni
Harlettes members
20th-century American actresses
21st-century American actresses
20th-century American women singers
20th-century American singers
21st-century American women singers
21st-century American singers